Suresh Goel (20 June 1943 – 13 April 1978) was Indian national badminton champion and a recipient of Arjuna award.

Goel was born in Allahabad in Uttar Pradesh in 1943. He started playing badminton at young age of 10 and at the age of 14 was national junior champion. He was the men's national singles champion on five occasions from 1962 to 1970 and also won national titles in men's doubles and mixed doubles. He was honoured with Arjuna award in 1967. He represented India in Thomas Cup in 1960-61 and captained the Indian team against Indonesia at Jaipur in 1969-70. He also played in U.S. Open Badminton Championships in 1967 and reached the final where he lost to Erland Kops of Denmark. He played at the prestigious All England Championship many times. He represented India at 1966 Kingston and 1970 Edinburgh Commonwealth Games and in 1972 Munich Olympic Games. In 1978 at the age of 35 he died of heart failure while exercising at the running track of the amphitheatre grounds of the Banaras Hindu University.

External links 

Suresh Goel
Statistics on badmintonindia.org

1943 births
1978 deaths
Indian male badminton players
Olympic badminton players of India
Indian national badminton champions
Commonwealth Games competitors for India
Recipients of the Arjuna Award
Sportspeople from Allahabad
Racket sportspeople from Uttar Pradesh
Badminton players at the 1972 Summer Olympics
Badminton players at the 1966 British Empire and Commonwealth Games
Badminton players at the 1970 British Commonwealth Games